We is the second extended play by South Korean boy group Winner, released on May 15, 2019 under the label YG Entertainment. This marks their first extended play release since Exit : E in February 2016. The EP features the lead single "Ah Yeah (아예)".
The physical release comes in four versions: Black, Silver, Blue, and White.

Promotion
YG Entertainment began promoting the EP on May 1 with a mysterious coming soon poster indicating comeback. On May 3, the date of the comeback was unveiled, followed by the EP title on May 7 and the lead single title on May 9. An hour prior of release, a live countdown special was broadcast on Naver Vlive. On May 18, Winner made their first music show appearance for their comeback on MBC's Show! Music Core, following appearance on SBS' Inkigayo the next day. On May 28, Winner appeared as guests on JTBC's Idol Room.

Commercial performance
Upon release, the lead single "Ah Yeah (아예)" charted at number one on all South Korean charts, including Melon, Genie and Mnet. The EP We debuted at number one on the Gaon Albums Chart, selling up to 119,000 copies within the first two weeks of release. On China music platforms including QQ Music and Kugou, the EP sold over 120,000 copies within the first week of release. The lead single received its first music show win on Mnet's MCountdown on May 23, 2019.

Track listing

Charts

Release history

References

External links 

 

2019 EPs
YG Entertainment EPs
Winner (band) EPs
Korean-language EPs